Lifford Bridge (in Irish Droichead Leifear) is a cross-border bridge spanning the River Foyle in Ireland. It connects Strabane in County Tyrone, Northern Ireland, and Lifford in County Donegal in the Republic of Ireland, joining the A38 road to the N15. It remains a vital part of the trans-border route from the North, West and East of County Donegal, to Dublin via County Tyrone.

History
Strabane District Council took over the functions of Tyrone County Council in part of West Tyrone in 1973. The overall length of the bridge is 115m. In 2005 it carried some 16,000 vehicles a day.

During The Troubles in 1968, an attempt was made to blow the bridge up. However, it was closed for only a short time.

In 2005 refurbishment of the bridge took place and cost £400,000.

References

Bridges completed in 1964
Bridges in the Republic of Ireland
Bridges in Northern Ireland
Buildings and structures in County Donegal
Buildings and structures in County Tyrone
Bridge
Republic of Ireland–United Kingdom border crossings